The Islamic Republic of Iran Wrestling Federation is the governing body for Wrestling in Iran. It is a member of the United World Wrestling (UWW).

References
 Islamic Republic of Iran wrestling Federation site

Organisations based in Tehran
National members of the Asian Council of Associated Wrestling
Wrestling in Iran
Wrestling